San Miguel de Cozumel is the largest city in Cozumel Municipality in the Mexican state of Quintana Roo. With a 2010 census population of 77,236, it is also Quintana Roo's fourth-largest community, after Cancún, Chetumal, and Playa del Carmen. It is a hub for tourism on the Riviera Maya, providing the sole ferries between the Mexican mainland and the island.  In addition to the ferry service to Playa del Carmen, the first international cruise terminal in Quintana Roo is located in the city.

The International Pier has an international cruise wharf of 271 meters and a dolphin at 45 meters, giving it the ability to receive two cruise ships at once: the exterior band can receive voyager class ships of 140,000 displacement tons, and the interior band can receive ships up to 85,000 displacement tons.  A tender wharf is used to receive minor boats at the terminal.

References

2010 census tables: INEGI: Instituto Nacional de Estadística, Geografía e Informática

Populated places in Quintana Roo
Cozumel
Populated places in islands of Mexico